Toxotes blythii, the clouded archerfish or zebra archerfish, is a perciform fish of genus Toxotes. It is found in rivers and estuaries in Myanmar, ranging from the lower Irrawaddy to the Tenasserim Division, including lower Sittaung and Salween. Unlike some other archerfish, it is restricted to fresh water. This species was formerly thought to be identical to T. microlepis (smallscale archerfish). However, differences in structure and colouration caused the splitting of T. blythii into a new species. It is sometimes seen in the aquarium trade, but is generally rare.

Description 
For a while, Toxotes blythii was confused with Toxotes microlepis until key characteristics that separated them into different species were found. In Toxotes blythii, the depth of body was not half of the total length (without caudal tail), the fourth dorsal spine had about the same length as the third dorsal spine, and the third anal spine was the same length as the third dorsal spine, which was almost as long as the soft rays. Also, Toxotes blythii has irregular black spots that ran horizontally on the body and had a black spot sitting below its axilla. The archerfishes that possess the ability to shoot streams of water, such as Toxotes blythii, use a network of tubes within the roof of their mouth and a well grooved tongue, which aids in water shooting, is also seen. Toxotes blythii has a metallic sheen seen across its body. While Toxotes microlepis has a body depth of one half of its total length without the caudal tail, its fourth dorsal spine was much longer than the third dorsal spine, the third anal spine was a little longer than the second dorsal spine, and the third anal spine was shorter than its soft rays. Not only that, but Toxotes microlepis has four vertical black spots on the dorsal region of the fish. The shape of the archerfish's spots can sometimes help distinguish different species. Toxotes blythii has a mouth the comes to a point, most likely to help with its ability to shoot water, as well as a homocercal tail. Syntypes of Toxotes blythii are shown to have a standard length of 61 to 131 mm. Archerfishes have ctenoid scales with 3-9 radii originating from the focus point to the anterior margin. Also, Toxotes blythii, has one of the smallest scales within the Toxitidae family. Even though there are few specimens of this species collected, there are many characteristics that distinguish Toxotes blythii from the other archerfishes.

Development 
Finding a clouded archerfish within its natural habitat can be quite the challenge and to make matters worse, this archerfish also has a high value in the market. With that said, other archerfishes, such as Toxotes microlepis, have been researched more and may provide some insight into the development of Toxotes blythii. As archer fishes get older their scales become longer and heavier, and as their scales become longer it is also seen that their standard length also increases. The gonads for the male species begins elongated with clear/red coloration then becomes larger with deep red coloration and at full maturity, they are pale red and dense. In female Toxotes microlepis, the gonads begin small, smooth, elongated, and pink; by the end of sexual maturity, they are shriveled with a yellow cloudy color before they are released. Archerfishes usually go through their developmental process between July and October.

Behavior 
One of the most well knows behaviors of the archerfish is their ability to turn water into a projectile. Even though we would think all archerfish can do this, only there are only three species known to shoot water out of their mouth, Toxotes jaculatrix, Toxotes chatareus and, Toxotes blythii. These species turn water into a projectile from the sudden compression of water from the pharynx into the palatine canal and use their tongue to control the flow. When groups of Toxotes chatareus are going for the same prey, some members will take the food that other fish shot down, more formally known as kleptoparasitism. Another fascinating aspect of these archerfish is how quickly they can learn and adjust the direction of their water projectiles to fit their needs at the time. By changing the direction of their water stream when they miss, their odds of hitting it next time will be better. Since archerfish shoot at their prey with water, they typically will reside near the surface of the habitat they are in.

Food habits 
Toxotes blythii and other archerfishes are relatively small fish, and their food is smaller than them. While more research needs to be done on Toxotes blythii and its diet, other species' diets are well known. Fully grown Toxotes chatareus and Toxotes jaxculatrix tend to eat small crabs, shrimps, and insects while their larvae eat phytoplankton and zooplankton. Toxotes chatareus and Toxotes jaxculatrix can be found in salt and brackish water. Since Toxotes blythii lives strictly in fresh water they will mostly likely not eat crabs and shrimp, but the possibility of insects is extremely high. The archer fish eating habits change over time to fit their physiological need. Even though there is no data about the food habits of Toxotes blythii it still gives clues to what types of food they eat.

Predation 
There are no significant organisms that prey on Toxotes blythii and other species of Toxotidae other than humans. These archerfishes have excellent eyesight and can swim very fast which can make them hard prey to catch. Other than their abilities these fish are often hidden within the root system in mangroves and foliage in their natural habitats, which adds to their ability to evade predators. These fishes are often preyed upon by humans as a source of food, usually the people that live near their habitat, and as aquarium fishes. Other than humans, the organisms that prey on Toxotes blythii are unknown.

Ecosystem roles 
While Toxotes blythii is not a huge predator animal in the food chain it is still a predator. The amount of Toxotes blythii present within an area can have an impact on the organisms they feed on, such as the terrestrial insects.

Economic importance 
Toxotes blythii has a positive effect on human economics. Even a 10 cm Toxotes blythii can be sold for a high price in Indonesia and the demand for this archerfish in the aquarium trade keeps it valuable. Toxotes blythii can also be used as a food source for the local people.

References

Archerfish
Fish described in 1892
Fish of Myanmar